Dissoplaga is a genus of moths in the family Geometridae.

Species
 Dissoplaga flava Moore, 1888

References
 Dissoplaga at Markku Savela's Lepidoptera and Some Other Life Forms
 Natural History Museum Lepidoptera genus database

Ennominae